The Militia Artillery units of the United Kingdom and Colonies (including Canada, New Brunswick, Nova Scotia, Newfoundland, Australia, New Zealand, and South Africa prior to their attaining dominion status) were military reserve units made up of volunteers who served part-time during peacetime, training to take over responsibility for manning fixed artillery batteries from the regular Royal Artillery during times of war.

Most of these batteries were of coastal artillery positioned to guard ports, naval bases, and coastal locations likely to be used by an enemy to land invading forces, or were designed to protect coastal batteries from overland attacks by infantry. A single militia artillery unit, the Lancashire Royal Field Artillery, was also created in the United Kingdom as field artillery, equipped with mobile guns.

History

Early history
With the increasing importance of artillery defences by the mid-Nineteenth century (and the usual reluctance of the British Government to fund an expansion of the regular military forces), a military reserve artillery force became a pressing concern to aid in maintaining the fixed defensive batteries (the units tasked with these duties were referred to either as garrison artillery or coastal artillery). Through the Eighteenth Century, and up to the end of the Napoleonic Wars and the American War of 1812, the military reserve forces that supported (but were not part of either) the British Army and the Board of Ordnance Military Corps (which included the Royal Artillery, the Royal Engineers, and the Royal Sappers and Miners) included the Militia (which was normally an all-infantry force), and the mounted Yeomanry. During wartime, these were supplemented by Volunteer units that were normally disbanded with peace. Royal Artillery coastal batteries were often brought up to strength with drafts from the British Army or the militia, or by temporarily re-tasking militia units or raising volunteer artillery corps. In Bermuda, from the Seventeenth Century until after the American War of 1812, men with status and the required funds were appointed as Captains of forts (which spared them from any obligation to serve in the Militia), in command of fortified coastal batteries manned by volunteers through peace and war.

Reorganisation
In 1852, with fear of an invasion of Britain by France, the reserve forces were re-organised. The Militia, which had become a paper tiger, changed from a conscripted force to one in which recruits voluntarily engaged for a term of service. It also ceased to be an all-infantry force. As the most critical shortage was of garrison artillery, a number of Militia Infantry regiments were re-tasked as Militia Artillery, and new militia units were also raised as artillery. The Militia Artillery units, which (like other reserve units) were raised under the Lords-Lieutenants of counties, who appointed officers), and were all tasked with garrison duties at fixed batteries. The invasion scare also led to the re-establishment of the Volunteer Force as a permanent (though only part-time, except when embodied for emergencies) branch of the British military. This force (which differed from the Militia primarily in that its volunteers did not engage for a term of service, and might quit with fourteen days notice, except while embodied) contained a mixture of artillery, engineering and infantry units. Similar militia and Volunteer units were also raised in various British colonies.

During the latter half of the Nineteenth Century, the military forces were re-organised through a succession of reforms, with the Board of Ordnance abolished after the Crimean War. Its military corps, including the Royal Artillery, as well as its civilian Commissariat, transport and stores organs were absorbed into the British Army. The Militia and the Volunteer Force units were more closely integrated with the British Army, though remaining separate forces.

In 1882, the Militia Artillery units lost their individual identities, becoming numbered brigades organised within Royal Artillery territorial divisions, of which the British Isles were divided into eleven. In 1889 the number of divisions was reduced to three, and the Militia Artillery brigades were renamed again, mostly regaining some variation of their original territorial names.

The Home (i.e., British Isles) Militia Artillery collectively had constituted a Corps of Militia Artillery, within which units had been numbered in order-of-precedence until 1882. The Home Militia as a whole also formed a numbered Corps of the British Army in the Twentieth Century. Separately from the Home Militia, Militia units of Bermuda, Malta and the Channel Islands were numbered together also on the British Army order-of-precedence of corps (amongst themselves, they were ordered in accordance with the precedence of their parent corps). Other colonial Militia Artillery units not funded by the War Office were considered auxiliary forces and did not appear on the British Army order-of-precedence (making them British military units, but not part of the British military force titled the British Army, nor constituting separate armies or parts of separate armies).

Disbanding
When the Volunteer Force and the Yeomanry in the United Kingdom were merged to create the Territorial Force in 1908, the Militia was redesignated the Special Reserve. At the same time, plans were made to convert all of the Royal Garrison Artillery (Militia) units to Royal Field Artillery, but all were instead disbanded (although Militia Artillery units remained in some of the colonies, and these were not redesignated as Special Reserve. The most notable of these was the Bermuda Militia Artillery, which, like the Bermuda Volunteer Rifle Corps, formed part of the garrison of the important Imperial Fortress colony of Bermuda). The remainder of the Special Reserve was redesignated as the Militia again after the First World War and permanently suspended.

Ranks and insignia
Prior to 1882, each Militia Artillery unit in the United Kingdom wore a unique badge. Between 1882 and 1889, Militia Artillery brigades wore a divisional badge based on that of the Royal Artillery, except that the lower scroll and upper scroll, which on the Royal Artillery badge were inscribed "Quo Fas Et Gloria Ducunt" and "Ubique" (which indicated the regular Royal Artillery, like the Royal Engineers, served everywhere), were respectively inscribed with the name of the territorial division name (by example, North Irish Division) and left blank or covered in a spray of laurel (as the Militia and Volunteer Force were both home defence forces, the members of which could not be sent abroad on expedition without their consents). From 1889 to 1902, the lower scroll was inscribed with the name of the unit (by example, Antrim Artillery) and the upper scroll left blank or covered in a spray of laurel. Grenade badges, whether worn as a collar badge or elsewhere, lacked the scroll inscribed "Ubique" that was part of the regular Royal Artillery version.

Militia Artillery units were made up of Militia officers and other ranks, with a Permanent Staff made up of seconded Royal Artillery officers and senior other ranks, including a single officer acting as both Commandant and Adjutant (where a suitably qualified Militia officer was unavailable to serve as Commandant), or only as Adjutant where the Commandant was a Militia officer.

Following the separation of the garrison companies from the Royal Artillery into the Royal Garrison Artillery in 1899, the Militia Artillery units were re-titled accordingly in 1902 (by example, The Antrim Royal Garrison Artillery (Militia), which would usually be rendered Antrim R.G.A (M)). The badge adopted was the same as that of the regular Royal Regiment of Artillery, including the "ubique" and "Quo Fas Et Gloria Ducunt" scrolls, with a letter "M" fixed at the bottom of the gun badge, and on the body of the grenade on the grenade badge (also with the "ubique" scroll), whether worn on the collar or on a cap. Alternately, Ubique was replaced on scrolls with the name of the city, county or colony for which the unit was named.

List of Militia Artillery units

References

 
Royal Artillery